Rugushuiyeh-ye Olya (also Romanized as Rūgūshū’īyeh-ye ‘Olyā; also known as Rogūshū’īyeh-ye Bālā, Rūgoshū’īyeh-ye ‘Olyā, Rūgūshū’īyeh Bālā, and Rūgūshū’īyeh-ye Bālā) is a village in Jowzam Rural District, Dehaj District, Shahr-e Babak County, Kerman Province, Iran. At the 2006 census, its population was 71, in 26 families.

References 

Populated places in Shahr-e Babak County